Timothy Iver Murphy (January 10, 1951 – June 30, 2018) was an American poet and businessman. Reviewing Timothy Murphy's second collection in Contemporary Poetry Review in 2002, Paul Lake observed that "What Virgil was to the Italian peninsula and Homer to the Greek Mediterranean, Murphy is to the swatch of plains stretching from the Upper Midwest to the Rockies like a grassy inland sea."

Life
Murphy was the son of Vincent and Katherine Bye Murphy. He was raised in Moorhead, Minnesota. Murphy was admitted to Yale University as an undergraduate. He was mentored there by Robert Penn Warren, the renowned poet and novelist. In 1972, he graduated with a B.A. degree and was designated Scholar of the House in Poetry. However, Warren declined to recommend Murphy for an academic position. Warren urged him instead to return to the "rich soil" of his rural roots. Murphy returned to Minnesota, where he joined his father in an insurance and estate planning business. He subsequently became involved in several farming and manufacturing enterprises in North Dakota.
He died at the age of 67.

Poetry
Murphy published his first collection of poetry, The Deed of Gift, in 1998; the collection represents all of Murphy's work as a poet through about 1996. In a contemporary review of the volume, Gerry Cambridge summarized Murphy's accomplishment: "There are outstanding poems here, including 'Harvest of Sorrows', 'Sunset at the Getty', and 'The Quarrel', as well as a great number of very likeable, individual, and tautly-made pieces. It would be hard to confuse Murphy with any other contemporary poet. No one else writing poetry in English sounds quite like him." As poet Dick Davis has noted, this distinctive style owes much to Murphy's use of traditional meter and rhyme, unusual among poets today: "His poems are wholly his own, and yet the voice in them lives in and through his mastery of traditional metre, which is so thorough as to seem indivisible from the poems' sensibility and meaning."  This focus on rhyme and meter is exemplified in the following excerpt from "Harvest of Sorrows":

In a 2001 interview, Murphy cited C.P. Cavafy and Homer as influences, noting that they, like himself, were gay. In 2011, The Dakota Institute published two collections of Murphy's poetry, Mortal Stakes and Faint Thunder and Hunter's Log. Murphy joked in an interview that year that "I've got more inventory than Ford Motor Co." After 2011, Murphy's poetry has been published by The North Dakota State University Press. Devotions (2017) is a substantial (160-page) collection that gathers poems from his return to the Catholic Church after 2005.  Dana Gioia concludes his introduction:  "These are genuine poems rooted in a passionate encounter with the divine. I predict they will find many devoted readers." In 2019, Hunter's Log: Volumes II & III appeared posthumously.

Bibliography
 A collection of Murphy's poetry.
 Reviewed by David Solheim.
 Murphy's second collection of poetry.
 Verse translation of Beowulf. Alan Sullivan (1948–2010) was Murphy's partner.

References

Further reading
Links to 20 of Murphy's poems at the poemtree.com website; The Poem Tree is an online anthology of metrical poetry.
 Murphy's poem that won the 1996 Howard Nemerov Sonnet Award.
Webcast of Murphy reading at Bookfest 2004, at Library of Congress website; RealPlayer format, 24 minutes.
February 2010 podcast of Murphy reading recent poems as part of "Distinguished Performance" series on Eratosphere Poetry board; MP3 format, approximately 40 minutes.
"Tim Murphy in His Own Words" Interview with Rob Godfrey, recorded for localradio.fr, February 2010; MP3 format, approximately 35 minutes.
 Biography and links to about a dozen of Murphy's poems.

Poems in various issues of Shit Creek Review.
Poem sequence in The Flea.
 Interview with Murphy; see also 
Audio interview of Murphy at Prairie Public with Doug Hamilton.
Video interview of Murphy for Prairie Public Television with John Harris.

1951 births
2018 deaths
People from Hibbing, Minnesota
American male poets
Yale University alumni
Poets from Minnesota
American gay writers
American LGBT poets
LGBT people from Minnesota
20th-century American poets
20th-century American male writers
21st-century American poets
21st-century American male writers
Gay poets